Oktyabrskaya Hotel (Znamenskaya Hotel until 1887; Great Northern until 1930), a four-star hotel founded in 1851, is located in Central Saint Petersburg, in Vosstaniya Square.

Location 
The Oktiabrskaya Hotel is located in the historical centre of Saint Petersburg opposite Moscow Railway Station.

The hotel consists of two buildings: "Oktiabrskiy" (Ligovskiy av., 10) and "Ligovskiy" (Ligovskiy av., 41/83). Major shopping centers are located here, famous sights of St.-Petersburg, such as the Hermitage, Kazan Cathedral, Church of the Savior on Spilled Blood in a short walk from the hotel. It takes around half an hour to get to the airport "Pulkovo" by car.

Accommodations 
The Oktiabrskaya Hotel feature 2 restaurants named Assambleya and Abazhur. The hotel offers 484 rooms.

History 
1845 – the author of the project of the main building of the hotel was an architect A.P. Gemilian. Another famous architect R.A. Zhelyazevich supervised the project, also the Nikolai (further- Moscow) Railway Station was built under his supervision.

Constructible surface for the future hotel was presented to a merchant Ponomariov, but by the end of 1846 it turned out that the construction work was too slow, so the land was given to a collegiate adviser Count Y.I. Stanbock-Fermore and his wife. The count also bought another building not far from the hotel at the Ligovskiy avenue. The author of the project was also A.P. Gemilian. Now there is a Ligovskiy building of the hotel.

Severe restrictions on the activities of the tavern establishments and the hotel in particular made it difficult to run the hotel, so during several years it had changed several owners. For a few decades the building was renovated several times and the internal layout had been changed a lot.

1887 - the hotel was renamed to the "Great North".

At the end of 19th century the current owner of the hotel V.I. Soloviov had bought a steam & horse omnibus, steered by a coachman that used to run between the hotel and all the railway stations of the city. During the period between 1896 and 1912 additional floors were built, which resulted in a number of rooms increase.

In 1904, Alexei Pokotilov, a terrorist who was involved in the assassination of Internal Affairs Minister Vyacheslav von Plehve was killed in an explosion at the hotel.

The revolutionary events of 1917 affected the "Great Northern" hotel. By September 1, 1918, all the movable property of the hotel had been inventoried and the building and all of the furniture went to the Office of Nikolai (October) Railway. In 20th years the City Residence of the Proletariat was founded in the hotel, where the waifs from the city were brought.

1929 – During the years of NEP, the life in Saint-Petersburg had improved so there was a strong need in hotels that could accommodate increased number of tourists.  At the end of 1929 the former hotel rooms had been vacated, and renovation of the hotel was started. In 1930, the hotel under the new name "Oktiabrskaya" was ready to receive guests.

During World War II a permanent establishment for tram and trolleybus transport workers was organized there, the premises could accommodate up to 400 people, for whom it was a salvation during the cold winter. After breaking through the blockade the hotel began to work as usual.

The new reconstruction was carried out on the eve of "Olympic 80". The building was reconstructed to recreate the façade of the project of 1871, as during that time the outward of the building harmonized the architecture of the railway station in the best way. Unfortunately, after the Olympics the hotel had not received measurable financial investments.

In 1994 the hotel got a new impulse when the state-owned enterprise was transformed into a public company, 60% of the shares were owned by the city, 40% - were distributed among the workforce, a new management team got down to business.

In 1996 a decision to completely renovate the hotel was made. 24 million dollars of internal funds was allocated which was unprecedented for that period. The concept was developed by the architectural studio of Yevgeny Gerasimov and included both external façade changes and complete reconstruction of rooms and hallways. The hotel acquired two boiler rooms and a laundry, an air-conditioning system was installed, a modern water purification system was set up, service lines were changed and also an electronic key system was introduced.

On July 8, 2008, after the full-scale reconstruction was complete of the hotel was officially assigned to the category of 4*.

In March 2011 Hotels "Oktiabrskaya", "Saint-Petersburg" and "Ol'gino" merged into a holding company under the brand "Citytel". The Management Company was established in order to improve management efficiency and service quality, further development of the network is being planned.

References 

 V.A.Ivanov, A.S. Evlanovа «Oktiabrskaya Hotel in St. Petersburg's history».
Publishing house«Русская коллекция СПб», 2001

External links
Official website
 Booking.com page

Hotel buildings completed in 1851
1851 establishments in the Russian Empire
Hotels in Saint Petersburg
Hotels articles needing infoboxes
Hotels